The FIS Nordic World Ski Championships 2013 took place in Val di Fiemme. Ski jumping competitions took place on 21 February - 2 March in Predazzo at Trampolino Dal Ben.

It was the second time, together with the Championships 2011, that 5 ski jumping competitions were held. There were three individual competitions (one for men and one for women at the normal hill, HS 106, and one for men at the large hill, HS 134) and two team competitions (one for men at the large hill and one mixed at the normal hill). It was the first time for the mixed competition to be held at the World Championships. Each team consisted of two men and two women.

The winners from Oslo were defending the champion's titles: Thomas Morgenstern (individual men competition, normal hill), Gregor Schlierenzauer (individual men competition, large hill), Daniela Iraschko (individual women competition, normal hill) and the Austria team (team men competition, large hill).

At the individual women competition at the normal hill, the gold medal won Sarah Hendrickson, silver - Sara Takanashi, and bronze - Jacqueline Seifriedsberger.

In the first men competition, the winner was Anders Bardal. The second was Gregor Schlierenzauer, and the third - Peter Prevc.

In the mixed competition won the team of Japan (Yūki Itō, Daiki Itō, Sara Takanashi and Taku Takeuchi). The silver medal went to Austria (Chiara Hölzl, Thomas Morgenstern, Jacqueline Seifriedsberger, Gregor Schlierenzauer), and the bronze one – to Germany (Ulrike Gräßler, Richard Freitag, Carina Vogt, Severin Freund).

In individual men competition at large hill won Kamil Stoch, in front of Prevc and Anders Jacobsen.

Austria managed to defend the champion's title in the team men competition. The team consisted of Wolfgang Loitzl, Manuel Fettner, Thomas Morgenstern and Gregor Schlierenzauer. The silver medal won the Germany team (Andreas Wank, Severin Freund, Michael Neumayer, Richard Freitag), and the bronze one – the Poland team (Maciej Kot, Piotr Żyła, Dawid Kubacki, Kamil Stoch).

It were the 36. World Championships in ski jumping for men and the 3. for women.

Before the Championships

World Cup 

Before the Championships, 21 individual and 5 team (including one mixed) World Cup competitions took place. The most wins had Gregor Schlierenzauer (8 times). In three competitions won Anders Jacobsen; two wins for Severin Freund, Andreas Kofler and Jan Matura. Only once won Anders Bardal, Robert Kranjec, Jaka Hvala and Richard Freitag. The leader in general classification was Schlierenzauer, who had 538 points more than Bardal and 588 points more than Jacobsen.

Almost three weeks before the Championships, Gregor Schlierenzauer beat the Matti Nykänen's  record of wins in the World Cup competitions. In Harrachov, he won for 48 time in his career.

In November 2012, for the first time, the mixed competition took place. It belonged to the World Cup. The winner was Norway (Maren Lundby, Tom Hilde, Anette Sagen, Anders Bardal); second place for Japan, and third - for Italy.

Favourites 
One of the favourites, the gold medalist from Oslo, Daniela Iraschko, resign from the Championships because of injury. Sara Takanashi, Sarah Hendrickson, Coline Mattel, Evelyn Insam, Jacqueline Seifriedsberger, Anette Sagen and Katja Požun were seen as favourites.

In individual men competition at normal hill the favourites were Gregor Schlierenzauer, Anders Bardal, Richard Freitag, Severin Freund, Michael Neumayer and Manuel Fettner. The favourite became also the oldest jumper Noriaki Kasai, because of his long jump during training session.

In the mixed competition the favourites were Austria, Slovenia, Japan, Germany and Norway.

For gold medal in the team men competition the favourites were Austria, Norway, Japan and Germany. What is more, Poland and Slovenia were mentioned as favourites, too.

Ski jumping hills 
Three competitions took place at the normal hill - individual women and men competition and mixed competition. There were two competitions at the large hill - individual and team men competition.

Jury 
Chief of the Competition were: Chika Yoshida (women competitions) and Walter Hofer (men competitions). Yoshida's assistant was Agnieszka Baczkowska, and Hofer's assistant was Miran Tepeš.

Medalists

Men

Individual competition HS106 (23.02.2013)

Individual competition HS134 (28.02.2013)

Team competition HS134 (02.03.2013)

Women

Individual competition HS106 (22.02.2013)

Mixed team competition HS106 (24.02.2013)

Medal count

Results

Men

Individual competition HS106 (23.02.2013)

Individual competition HS134 (28.02.2013)

Team competition HS134 (02.03.2013)

Women

Individual competition HS106 (22.02.2013)

Mixed competition HS106 (24.02.2013)

Accidents 

There were two accidents during the individual women competition at normal hill. Line Jahr fell after her 90-meter jump and Léa Lemare fell after she jumped 84 meters.

During the individual men competition at large hill, Thomas Morgenstern fell after his first jump. It happen just after he crossed the fall line and his notes were normal. Because of the fall, Morgenstern's knee was injured and he couldn't jump in some competitions after the Championships.

During the team men competition, Manuel Fettner managed not to fall before the fall line. His right ski got detached but he managed to keep the balance until the fall line.

FIS Nordic World Ski Championships 2013